Hopkins Highway is a short highway in south-western Victoria, Australia, serving to link the Hamilton Highway at Mortlake with the Princes Highway (and the western end of the Great Ocean Road nearby) at the port city of Warrnambool.

Route
Hopkins Highway begins at the intersection with Hamilton Highway on the western edge of Mortlake and runs in a south-westerly direction as a dual-lane, single-carriageway road, running in close proximity to the Hopkins River (and crossing it in Ellerslie). It eventually ends in the centre of Warrnambool.

History
The passing of the Transport Act of 1983 (itself an evolution from the original Highways and Vehicles Act of 1924) provided for the declaration of State Highways, roads two-thirds financed by the State government through the Road Construction Authority (later VicRoads). The Hopkins Highway was declared a State Highway in December 1990, from Mortlake to Warrnambool; before this declaration, the road was referred to as Warrnambool-Mortlake Road.

The Hopkins Highway was signed as State Route 104 between Mortlake and Warrnambool in 1990; with Victoria's conversion to the newer alphanumeric system in the late 1990s, it was replaced by route B120.

The passing of the Road Management Act 2004 granted the responsibility of overall management and development of Victoria's major arterial roads to VicRoads: in 2004, VicRoads re-declared the road as Hopkins Highway (Arterial #6010) between the Hamilton Highway in Mortlake and the Princes Highway at Warrnambool.

Upgrades
1867 – Ellerslie Bridge, a large timber and masonry bridge over the Hopkins River at Ellerslie, at the crossing place then known as Letts Ford; it is Victoria's second-oldest positively dated timber-beam road bridge, originally opened 30 May 1867
1967 – Ellerslie Bridge replacement, a  five-span prestressed concrete beam and reinforced concrete bridge, constructed adjacent to, and replacing, the timber version at 100 years old

Major intersections

See also

 Highways in Australia
 Highways in Victoria

References

Highways in Victoria (Australia)
Warrnambool
Transport in Barwon South West (region)